Rigadoon is a novel by the French writer Louis-Ferdinand Céline, published posthumously in 1969. The story is based on Céline's escape from France to Denmark after the invasion of Normandy, after he had been associated with the Vichy regime. It is the third part in a trilogy about these experiences; it was preceded by Castle to Castle from 1957 and North from 1960.

Legacy

It was also adapted into a graphic novel by Paul and Gaëtan Brizzi, along with Céline's other novels North and Castle to Castle.

See also
 1969 in literature
 20th-century French literature

References
Notes

Bibliography
 

1969 French novels
Novels by Louis-Ferdinand Céline
French autobiographical novels
Novels set during World War II
World War II memoirs
Novels adapted into comics
Novels published posthumously
Éditions Gallimard books